Master Abdullah (Punjabi), (1930 – 31 January 1994) was a Pakistani film music composer. He is known for his music in movies like, "Badla" (1968), "Commander" (1968), "Ziddi" (1973), and "Sheeshay Ka Ghar" (1978).

Early life and family
He was born in 1930 in Lahore. His elder brother Master Inayat Hussain (1923-1993) was a film music composer in the early days of Pakistan film industry and was better known in Pakistan than Master Abdullah himself.

Career
Master Abdullah began his film career in 1962 with an Urdu language film Suraj Mukhi (1962).

Major Films of Master Abdullah
 Malangi (1965)
 Laado (1966)
 Badla (1968)
 Commander (1968)
 Rangu Jatt (1970)
 Ziddi (1973) (won for this film Best Film Music Director Nigar Award in 1973)
 Shehanshah (1974)
 Sharif Badmash (1975)
 Sheeshay Ka Ghar (1978)
 Jatt Mirza (1982)
 Qismet (1985)

Compositions
Songs composed by Master Abdullah include:
 Mahi way saano bhul na jaaven, Singer: Noor Jehan, Movie:Malingi (1965)
 Phhikki pay gayi chan tarian di lou, Singer: Noor Jehan, Movie: Badla (1968)
 Jan e man itna bata do mohabbat hai kiya, Singer: Runa Laila, Movie: Commander (1968)
 Chal chaliay duniya di os nukray, Singer: Noor Jehan / Mehdi Hassan, Movie: Duniya Paise Di (1971)
 Mera dilbar mera dildar ton en, Singer: Tassawar Khanum, Movie: Jaagde Rena (1972)
 Way chadd meri veni no maroor, Singer: Noor Jehan, Movie: Ziddi (1973)
 Tere naal naal we main rena, Singer: Noor Jehan, Movie: Ziddi (1973)
 Ye safar tere mere piyar ka, Singer: Mehdi Hassan / Mehnaz, Movie: Sheeshay Ka Ghar (1978)

Awards
Master Abdullah won a Best Musician Nigar Award for the Punjabi film "Ziddi" in 1973.

References

1930 births
1994 deaths
Pakistani composers
Pakistani film score composers
People from Lahore
Punjabi people
Nigar Award winners
Pakistani musicians